Jesse Kaislavuo (born 24 April 1992) is a Finnish racing cyclist. He won the Finnish national road race title in 2016.

References

External links

1992 births
Living people
Finnish male cyclists
Place of birth missing (living people)